Jason Tré (born 18 March 1998) is a French professional footballer who plays as a left back for  club Red Star.

Club career
Tré was trained at INF Clairefontaine and Caen, signing for Paris FC ahead of the 2018–19 season.

He made his senior debut for Paris FC in a 3–0 Ligue 2 loss to Lorient on 29 July 2019.

In November 2019 Tré left Paris FC and signed a two-year contrat fédéral (semi-pro contract) with Laval.

On 16 August 2021, he moved to Red Star.

References

External links
 
 
 SM Caen Profile

1998 births
Living people
Sportspeople from Saint-Denis, Seine-Saint-Denis
French footballers
Footballers from Seine-Saint-Denis
Association football fullbacks
Paris FC players
Stade Lavallois players
Red Star F.C. players
Ligue 2 players
Championnat National players
Championnat National 3 players